Rositz is a Verwaltungsgemeinschaft ("collective municipality") in the district Altenburger Land, in Thuringia, Germany. The seat of the Verwaltungsgemeinschaft is in Rositz.

The Verwaltungsgemeinschaft Rositz consists of the following municipalities:

Göhren 
Göllnitz 
Kriebitzsch 
Lödla 
Mehna
Monstab 
Rositz
Starkenberg

References

Verwaltungsgemeinschaften in Thuringia